AnJazz or Hamar Jazz Festival is an annual jazz festival occurring at Hamar, Norway.

History 
The festival has been arranged since 2005. The Hamar Theater is the festival's secretariat and represents the festival's point of contact and operational unit during the festival. The association has a close collaboration with the initiator Anja Katrine Tomter, who is the festival producer.

References

Eksterne lenker 
 

2005 in Norway
Jazz festivals in Norway
Music festivals established in 2005